America Georgina Ferrera (born April 18, 1984) is an American actress. Born in Los Angeles to Honduran parents, Ferrera developed an interest in acting at a young age, performing in several stage productions at her school. She made her feature film debut in 2002 with the comedy-drama Real Women Have Curves, earning praise for her performance. Ferrera has won an Emmy Award, a Golden Globe Award, and a Screen Actors Guild Award among others.

Ferrera achieved modest success early in her career with roles in films such as the Disney original film Gotta Kick It Up! (2002) and the comedy-drama The Sisterhood of the Traveling Pants (2005); the latter earned her the Imagen Award for Best Actress and her first nomination for the ALMA Award for Outstanding Actress in a Motion Picture. She undertook television roles including the eponymous role on the ABC comedy-drama Ugly Betty (2006–2010). She was praised for playing the protagonist of the series, Betty Suarez, and won several Best Actress Awards in 2007 at the Golden Globe Awards, the Screen Actors Guild Awards, and the Primetime Emmy Awards, the first for a Latina woman in the category.

Ferrera's other notable film roles include the drama The Dry Land (2010), the romantic comedy Our Family Wedding (2010), and the crime drama End of Watch (2012). She provided the voice of Astrid Hofferson in the How to Train Your Dragon franchise, including the three films and the television series Dreamworks Dragons. She co-produced and starred as Amy Sosa in the NBC workplace comedy series Superstore (2015–2021).

Time named her one of the 100 most influential people in the world in 2007.

Early life and education
Ferrera, the youngest of six children, was born in Los Angeles, California. Her parents, América Griselda Ayes and Carlos Gregorio Ferrera, were originally from Tegucigalpa, Honduras, and immigrated to the United States in the mid-1970s. Ferrera has stated that she has Lenca ancestry. Her mother worked as the director of the housekeeping staff for one of the Hilton Hotels, and stressed the importance of higher education. When Ferrera was 7, her parents divorced and her father returned to Honduras. Ferrera was estranged from her father when he died there in 2010.

Ferrera was raised in the Woodland Hills section of Los Angeles, where she attended Calabash Street Elementary School, George Ellery Hale Middle School and El Camino Real High School. At age seven she played a small role in a school production of Hamlet, and when she was 10 she played the Artful Dodger in Oliver!. 

While at El Camino High School, she took acting lessons. She entered the University of Southern California (USC) on a presidential scholarship, double-majoring in theatre and international relations. She dropped out to focus on her acting career, but completed her bachelor's degree in May 2013.

Career

Debut and early roles (2002–2005)
In July 2002, Ferrera appeared in her first television film, Gotta Kick It Up! for The Disney Channel. While at a theatre program at Northwestern University that same year, she made her feature movie debut in Real Women Have Curves. Ferrera followed this with roles in television (Touched by an Angel). She also appeared in the movie Plainsong, based on the novel by Kent Haruf, which also featured Aidan Quinn and Rachel Griffiths. Ferrera played a pregnant teenager, Victoria Roubideaux, who has been kicked out of her mother's house; she is taken in by two kindly brothers who live alone on a farm. In the 2005 film How the Garcia Girls Spent Their Summer, she starred as Bianca, a 17-year-old third-generation Mexican-American who is disgusted with the boys in her neighborhood but finds romance with a boy from a neighboring town. In 2006, she appeared in the short film 3:52, which won the Audience Award at the San Diego Women Film Festival. Later that year, she featured in the movie Steel City, which received nominations at the Film Independent Spirit Awards and the Sundance Film Festival. In December 2005, she appeared in the Off-Broadway play Dog Sees God: Confessions of a Teenage Blockhead, directed by Trip Cullman.

Breakthrough and rise to fame (2006–2010)

In 2006, Ferrera landed the lead role of Betty Suarez in ABC's new comedy-drama Ugly Betty, an adaptation of the successful Colombian telenovela Yo soy Betty, la fea (1999–2001), in which Ferrera portrays a girl whom her peers find extremely unattractive, thus the series title. As Betty Suarez, Ferrera wears braces, has bushy eyebrows and a disheveled wig, and cosmetics and clothing intended to downplay her own looks, in contrast to most of the "glammed up" characters; Ferrera herself invented the term "Bettification" to describe the process of creating her onscreen persona. In 2007, Ferrera won numerous accolades for her performance in the series; she also won the "triple crown" for acting in television; she won the Golden Globe Award for Best Actress – Television Series Musical or Comedy, the Screen Actors Guild Award for Outstanding Performance by a Female Actor in a Comedy Series, and the Primetime Emmy Award for Outstanding Lead Actress in a Comedy Series, becoming the first Latina woman to win the Outstanding Lead Actress Award.

In the wake of her Golden Globe win, Ferrera was congratulated by Hilda L. Solis in the United States House of Representatives and was commended for "helping to break down stereotypes and provide a role model for young Latinas". Time included Ferrera in their 2007 list of the 100 most influential people in the world. Also in 2007, Ferrera won the Imagen Foundation's Creative Achievement Award. Ferrera starred as Carmen in the 2005 film The Sisterhood of the Traveling Pants, and reprised the role in 2008's The Sisterhood of the Traveling Pants 2. Among other film work, she voice the role of Astrid in the hit animated film How to Train Your Dragon (2010). She also appeared in The Dry Land which premiered at the 2010 Sundance Film Festival and ran at the Dallas International Film Festival where it won the top prize in the Filmmaker Award for Best Narrative Feature.

Post-Ugly Betty projects and Superstore (2011–present)
Ferrera made her London stage debut on November 7, 2011, playing Roxie Hart in the musical Chicago in London's West End. In 2012, Ferrera was featured in the four-hour documentary Half the Sky: Turning Oppression into Opportunity for Women Worldwide, which premiered on PBS October 1 and 2, 2012. The series introduces women and girls living in very difficult circumstances and struggling to challenge them. The Half the Sky PBS TV series is produced by Show of Force along with Fugitive Films. Ferrera starred alongside David Cross and Julia Stiles in the dark comedy It's a Disaster, which premiered at the 2012 Los Angeles Film Festival and had a limited commercial release on April 12, 2013.

On May 17, 2013, ABC announced that Ferrera was cast in a limited-run telenovela titled Pedro & Maria, a modern-day take on Romeo and Juliet set in Washington, D.C. The series had been in development at MTV since 2010 with Ferrera serving as a director on the project, which would have interactive participation online content from viewers. ABC later decided not to move forward with the series. On March 16, 2015, Ferrera was added to the cast of the upcoming NBC sitcom Superstore, portraying Amy, a 10-year veteran floor supervisor at a superstore named Cloud 9. In addition to her main role, Ferrera also had co-production duties for the series. After NBC had initially announced a sixth season of the series, the network revealed on February 28, 2020, that Ferrera would be departing the series at the end of the fifth season citing new projects and spending time with family. Due to the COVID-19 pandemic shutting down Superstore's fifth season with one episode left to film, her departure was delayed into season 6 in order to give her character's arc a proper closure. On March 10, 2021, NBC announced that Ferrera would return for the show's one-hour series finale.

In February 2019, it was announced that Ferrera would be credited as an executive producer and director for the Netflix comedy-drama series Gentefied. The series premiered on February 21, 2020.

In February 2021, it was announced that Ferrera would make her feature length directorial debut with I Am Not Your Perfect Mexican Daughter, based on the young adult novel of the same name by Erika L. Sánchez. Adapted by Linda Yvette Chávez, the film will be a co-production with Netflix, Anonymous Content, Aevitas Creative Management and MACRO.

Personal life

Ferrera first met actor, director, and writer Ryan Piers Williams when he cast her in a student film at USC. The couple got engaged in June 2010, and married on June 27, 2011. On January 1, 2018, Ferrera and Williams revealed that they were expecting their first child. She announced on her Instagram page on May 29, 2018, that she had given birth that month to a boy, Sebastian. On May 4, 2020, Ferrera gave birth to a girl, Lucia. On June 27, 2020, Ferrera announced that she and Williams had been together for a total of 15 years.

In 2018, her edited anthology of stories, American Like Me: Reflections on Life Between Cultures, was published by Gallery Publishing Group.

Political activities
Ferrera has been politically active. During the 2008 presidential primaries, she, alongside Chelsea Clinton and Amber Tamblyn, led the Hillblazers organization in support of Hillary Clinton's campaign.

Ferrera attended both the 2012 Democratic National Convention in Charlotte, North Carolina, and the 2016 Democratic National Convention in Philadelphia. At the 2016 convention, she addressed the delegates as a speaker, sharing the stage with Lena Dunham.

Ferrera has been active, through her involvement with the organization Voto Latino and by appearing on various news programs, in getting Latinos in the United States to vote. Ferrera also works with Eva Longoria to co-host She Se Puede, a digital lifestyle platform which encourages voting within the Latina community. As a continuation of their work prior to the 2020 presidential campaign, Ferrera and Longoria recently held a textbanking event with VoteRiders to educate voters about Georgia's strict Voter ID laws ahead of the Georgia Senate runoff.

Ferrera was the opening speaker for the Women's March on Washington on January 21, 2017.

Ferrera spoke at the Families Belong Together protest on June 30, 2018.

Fighting sexual harassment
In October 2017, Ferrera began her participation in the #MeToo campaign, publicly revealing that she was sexually harassed when she was 9 years old. She did not reveal any details about the harassment or the person who harassed her. In January 2018, Ferrera was a founding member of the Time's Up legal defense fund.

Soccer investment
In July 2020, Ferrera was announced as an investor in a primarily female group that was awarded a Los Angeles-based franchise in the National Women's Soccer League. The new team, since unveiled as Angel City FC, started playing in 2022.

Other ventures
In April 2019, Ferrera gave a TEDTalk at a TED.

Filmography

Film

Television

Web

Music video

Awards and nominations

References

Bibliography

External links
 
 

1984 births
21st-century American actresses
Actresses from Los Angeles
American film actresses
American people of Honduran descent
American stage actresses
Angel City FC owners
Film producers from California
Television producers from California
American women television producers
American television actresses
American University alumni
American voice actresses
Best Musical or Comedy Actress Golden Globe (television) winners
Hispanic and Latino American actresses
Lenca people
Living people
Outstanding Performance by a Lead Actress in a Comedy Series Primetime Emmy Award winners
Outstanding Performance by a Female Actor in a Comedy Series Screen Actors Guild Award winners
People from Woodland Hills, Los Angeles
USC School of International Relations alumni
El Camino Real High School alumni
American women film producers